St. Peter the Apostle Catholic Church and Rectory is a historic Roman Catholic church and rectory located at 812 Pearl Street in Joplin, Jasper County, Missouri. The church was built in 1906, and is a Late Gothic Revival style building constructed of Carthage limestone.  It measures 63 feet, 6 inches, by 122 feet, 8 inches and features circular windows; tracery; Gothic arched windows and doors; and the triple portal entry.  The rectory was built in 1917, and is a two-story Prairie School style dwelling with a finished basement.  It is constructed of Carthage limestone and has a low pitched, hipped roof with wide overhang.  Also on the property is a contributing concrete block garage.

It was listed on the National Register of Historic Places in 1991 as a national historic district.

References

Churches in the Roman Catholic Diocese of Springfield–Cape Girardeau
Gothic Revival church buildings in Missouri
Prairie School architecture in Missouri
Roman Catholic churches completed in 1906
Buildings and structures in Joplin, Missouri
Churches on the National Register of Historic Places in Missouri
Historic districts on the National Register of Historic Places in Missouri
National Register of Historic Places in Jasper County, Missouri
1906 establishments in Missouri
20th-century Roman Catholic church buildings in the United States